Propeller is the fifth album by American indie rock band Guided by Voices.

Background

Conceived initially by Robert Pollard as a farewell album in the face of years of obscurity and mounting debt, the album ended up "propelling" the band to a higher-profile status and influence, affording a lasting position in the indie rock canon.

While significant portions were recorded in a professional recording studio (though later to be "lovingly fucked with" by Mike "Rep" Hummel, of Mike Rep and the Quotas), the album is notable for being the first of the band's albums to make extensive use of 4-track cassette and lo-fi recording techniques as an aesthetic unto itself.  Songs are frequently punctuated by unexpected blasts of noise, awkward tape edits, sped-up or slowed-down vocal or instrumental parts, and other sonic bric-a-brac.  An interesting result of this technique is the intro to the album's opening track, "Over the Neptune/Mesh Gear Fox".  What appears to be the sound of a band taking the stage before a throng of thousands of fans chanting "G-B-V! G-B-V!" was actually created by Guided by Voices in the studio (the band had not played live in years, and never to more than a handful of people at the time of recording).  Nevertheless, the inclusion of this clip ensured the canonization of the "G-B-V!" chant, heard at essentially every Guided by Voices concert thereafter, and the entire opening sequence was faithfully recreated at the band's final show before temporarily disbanding in 2004. It has been mainly used during encores at their shows.

Lyrics and music 
The first song on the album, "Over the Neptune/Mesh Gear Fox" is one of GBV's longest songs to this date with a playing time of 5:41.

The eleventh song on Propeller "Back to Saturn X Radio Report" is a collage of many songs Guided By Voices had recorded at the point of the release of the album. Most of the songs were originally going to appear on an album called Back to Saturn X that was scrapped in favor of Propeller . All of them were later released. They are (in order):

 "Buzzards and Dreadful Crows (Different Version)" (an alternate take of a track later released on Bee Thousand; this version appears on Suitcase: Failed Experiments and Trashed Aircraft)
 "Sopor Joe" (released on King Shit And The Golden Boys a part of the GBV box set Box)
 "Fantasy Creeps" (also on King Shit And the Golden Boys)
 "Back to Saturn X" (released on Hardcore UFOs: Revelations, Epiphanies and Fast Food in the Western Hemisphere box set)
 "Mr. Japan" (released on Suitcase: Failed Experiments and Trashed Aircraft)
 "Chicken Blows" (released on Alien Lanes)
 "Damn Good, Mr. Jam" (also on Static Airplane Jive)
 The "off and onward" clip that follows this has not been heard anywhere else.
 "Tractor Rape Chain (Clean it Up)" (original, and very different, version of "Tractor Rape Chain," which would later appear in a redone form on Bee Thousand. This version has only appeared on the Darla 100 - Sixth Year Anniversary Compilation CD)
 "Damn Good, Mr. Jam" reprise.

Artwork 
The cover art also contributed to the album's legend. Initially self-released only in a limited vinyl run of 500, each copy of the album received a unique, handmade cover.  Decorated by band members, friends and family with myriad methods such as screen-printing, hand-painting, and affixing various found objects (including an empty six-pack carton of Natural Light) to plain white sleeves, these albums grew in value over the years and as of 2005, were known to have sold for prices in the thousands of dollars.  The album was first given a wide release by Scat Records when it was appended to the CD version of GBV's 1993 album Vampire on Titus.  Later, both albums were given standalone CD releases.

In 2005, a new, non-limited and non-handmade vinyl edition was released, along with an updated CD version using a reproduction of a selection the original covers.

A gallery of original Propeller covers can be seen at the Guided by Voices database.

Reception 
Propeller was released to critical acclaim.

Track listing

Personnel 
The credits do not give specific instruments played by each individual, but rather list every performer who appeared on the release in any capacity.

Guided by Voices 

 Robert Pollard 
 Dan Toohey 
 Jim Pollard 
 Mitch Mitchell 
 Tobin Sprout 
 Greg Demos

Technical 

 Mike "Rep" Hummel – engineering

References

1992 albums
Guided by Voices albums